Montebruno is a comune (municipality) in the Metropolitan City of Genoa in the Italian region Liguria, located about  northeast of Genoa.

Montebruno borders the following municipalities: Fascia, Fontanigorda, Lorsica, Mocònesi, Rezzoaglio, Rondanina, Torriglia.

References

See also
 Parco naturale regionale dell'Antola

Cities and towns in Liguria